Abdul Latif Al-Sayed Abbas Youssef Hashem (born 18 April 1953) is a Kuwaiti hurdler. He competed in the men's 4 × 100 metres relay at the 1976 Summer Olympics.

References

External links
 

1953 births
Living people
Athletes (track and field) at the 1976 Summer Olympics
Athletes (track and field) at the 1980 Summer Olympics
Kuwaiti male sprinters
Kuwaiti male hurdlers
Olympic athletes of Kuwait
Place of birth missing (living people)
Asian Games medalists in athletics (track and field)
Asian Games silver medalists for Kuwait
Athletes (track and field) at the 1974 Asian Games
Medalists at the 1974 Asian Games
20th-century Kuwaiti people
21st-century Kuwaiti people